Mauricio Casillas Caballero (born 20 August 1990) is a Mexican badminton player. In 2015, he represented IBM Mexico competed at the World Corporate Games in Mexico City, and won the men's singles and doubles event.

Achievements

BWF International Challenge/Series 
Men's doubles

  BWF International Challenge tournament
  BWF International Series tournament
  BWF Future Series tournament

References

External links 
 
 

1990 births
Living people
Sportspeople from Mexico City
Mexican male badminton players